Somerset County Public Schools is a U.S. public school system serving the residents of Somerset County, Maryland.

History
The Somerset County schools became desegregated in 1969 after the federal government began to withheld education funds. The first African American School Superintendent was H. DeWayne Whittington was appointed in 1988.

High schools
Crisfield, Crisfield, Maryland
Washington, Princess Anne, Maryland

Middle schools
Somerset 6/7, Westover, Maryland

Elementary schools
Carter G. Woodson, Crisfield, Maryland
Deal Island, Deal Island, Maryland
Ewell, Ewell, Maryland
Greenwood, Princess Anne, Maryland
Princess Anne,  Princess Anne, Maryland

Other schools
J. M. Tawes Technology & Career Center, Westover

References

External links

School districts in Maryland
Education in Somerset County, Maryland